Buillisford, Texas is a ghost town in Crockett County, Texas. It maintained a post office from February through September 1882.

References

Crockett County, Texas
Ghost towns in Texas